Bertram Harold McInenly (May 6, 1906 – October 15, 1993) was a Canadian ice hockey player who played 166 games in the National Hockey League. Born in Quebec City, Quebec, he played for the Detroit Falcons, New York Americans, Ottawa Senators, and Boston Bruins between 1930 and 1936. The rest of his career, which lasted from 1925 to 1941, was spent in various minor leagues.

Career statistics

Regular season and playoffs

External links
 

1906 births
1993 deaths
Boston Bruins players
Boston Tigers (CAHL) players
Buffalo Bisons (AHL) players
Canadian ice hockey defencemen
Detroit Falcons players
Detroit Olympics (CPHL) players
Detroit Olympics (IHL) players
Ice hockey people from Quebec City
New York Americans players
Ottawa Senators (1917) players
Providence Reds players
Springfield Indians players
Syracuse Stars (AHL) players
Canadian expatriate ice hockey players in the United States